The Conasauga Formation is a geologic formation in Georgia. It preserves fossils dating back to the Cambrian period.

See also

 List of fossiliferous stratigraphic units in Georgia (U.S. state)
 Paleontology in Georgia (U.S. state)

References

 

Cambrian Georgia (U.S. state)
Cambrian southern paleotemperate deposits